The 2001 Chevrolet Monte Carlo 400 with the Looney Tunes was the 28th stock car race of the 2001 NASCAR Winston Cup Series and the 44th iteration of the event. The race was held on Saturday, September 8, 2001, in Richmond, Virginia, at Richmond International Raceway, a 0.75 miles (1.21 km) D-shaped oval. The race took the scheduled 400 laps to complete. In a wild finish, Ricky Rudd, driving for Robert Yates Racing, would battle with Richard Childress Racing driver Kevin Harvick in the final laps of the race. Harvick would send Rudd up on the track with 17 to go, but Rudd was eventually able to save the car. Rudd would then later payback Harvick with 7 to go, moving Harvick to win his 22nd career NASCAR Winston Cup Series victory and his second and final victory of the season. The win was also Robert Yates Racing's 50th victory as an organization. To fill out the podium, Harvick would finish second, and Dale Earnhardt, Inc. driver Dale Earnhardt Jr. would finish third.

Background 

Richmond International Raceway (RIR) is a 3/4-mile (1.2 km), D-shaped, asphalt race track located just outside Richmond, Virginia in Henrico County. It hosts the Monster Energy NASCAR Cup Series and Xfinity Series. Known as "America's premier short track", it formerly hosted a NASCAR Camping World Truck Series race, an IndyCar Series race, and two USAC sprint car races.

Entry list 

 (R) denotes rookie driver.

Practice

First practice 
The first practice session was held on Friday, September 7, at 11:30 AM EST. The session would last for two hours.

Second and final practice 
The final practice session, sometimes referred to as Happy Hour, was held on Friday, September 7, at 5:45 PM EST. The session would last for one hour and 30 minutes.

Qualifying 
Qualifying was held on Friday, September 7, at 3:00 PM EST. Each driver would have two laps to set a fastest time; the fastest of the two would count as their official qualifying lap. Positions 1-36 would be decided on time, while positions 37-43 would be based on provisionals. Six spots are awarded by the use of provisionals based on owner's points. The seventh is awarded to a past champion who has not otherwise qualified for the race. If no past champ needs the provisional, the next team in the owner points will be awarded a provisional.

Four drivers would fail to qualify: Andy Houston, Hut Stricklin, Hermie Sadler, and Carl Long.

Full qualifying results 

*Time not available.

Race results

References 

2001 NASCAR Winston Cup Series
NASCAR races at Richmond Raceway
September 2001 sports events in the United States
2001 in sports in Virginia